Year 162 (CLXII) was a common year starting on Thursday (link will display the full calendar) of the Julian calendar. In the Roman Empire, it was known as the Year of the Consulship of Rusticus and Plautius (or, less frequently, year 915 Ab urbe condita).

The denomination 162 AD for this year has been used since the early medieval period, when the Anno Domini calendar era became the prevalent method in Europe for naming years.

Events 
 By place 

 Roman Empire 
 Lucius Verus begins a war with the Parthians, due to the invasion of Syria and Armenia by King Vologases IV of Parthia.

 By topic 

 Art and Science 
 Arrian, Greek historian and writer, publishes Indica, a work on India and its people.

Births 
 Marcus Annius Verus Caesar, one of Roman emperor Marcus Aurelius's thirteen children (d. 169)

Deaths 
 Marcus Annius Libo, the second child and first son to Roman consul Marcus Annius Verus and Rupilia Faustina

References 
Indica in Greek at the Perseus Digital Library,  http://data.perseus.org/citations/urn:cts:greekLit:tlg0074.tlg002.perseus-grc1:1

Indica in Greek with side-by-side English translation at the Loeb Classics Library, https://www.loebclassics.com/view/arrian-indica/1983/pb_LCL269.307.xml